The 2006 Humboldt State Lumberjacks football team represented Humboldt State University during the 2006 NCAA Division II football season. Humboldt State competed as an independent in 2006, as the Great Northwest Athletic Conference (GNAC) did not sponsor football for the 2006 and 2007 seasons.

The 2006 Lumberjacks were led by seventh-year head coach Doug Adkins. They played home games at the Redwood Bowl in Arcata, California. Humboldt State finished the season with a record of nine wins and one loss (9–1). The nine wins was the highest for the Lumberjacks since the ten-win 1968 season. The Lumberjacks outscored their opponents 324–194 for the 2006 season.

Schedule

References

Humboldt State
Humboldt State Lumberjacks football seasons
Humboldt State Lumberjacks football